The Toys That Made Us is an American documentary streaming television series created by Brian Volk-Weiss. The first four episodes of the series began streaming on Netflix on December 22, 2017, and the next four were released on May 25, 2018. The eight-episode documentary series, as it was originally touted, focuses on the history of important toy lines. The first four episodes focus on the Star Wars, He-Man, Barbie, and G.I. Joe toy lines with subsequent episodes featuring LEGO, Transformers, Hello Kitty, and Star Trek, which aired on May 25, 2018. On July 19, 2018, it was announced at San Diego Comic-Con that the show had been picked up for a third season, with episodes featuring Power Rangers, professional wrestling, My Little Pony, and Teenage Mutant Ninja Turtles, and was released to Netflix on November 15, 2019.

In November 2019, Netflix released a spin-off series, The Movies That Made Us, focusing on the development of classic films.

Episodes

Series overview

Season 1 (2017)

Season 2 (2018)

Season 3 (2019)

References

External links

2017 American television series debuts
2019 American television series endings
2010s American documentary television series
English-language Netflix original programming
Netflix original documentary television series
Toy culture
Documentary television series about industry
Reagan Era